Margaret Zachariah is a former squash player from Australia. In 1981, she was runner-up to her fellow Australian player Vicki Cardwell at the British Open. She won the Australian Amateur Championship in 1977, and captured four Victorian state amateur squash championship titles in 1974, 1975, 1976 and 1979. Since retiring as a player, Zachariah has worked as a squash coach, training some of Australia's top players. She has also served as Secretary of both the Professional Squash Coaches Association of Australia and the Professional Squash Coaches Association of Victoria.

References

External links
 

Australian female squash players
Year of birth missing (living people)
Living people
20th-century Australian women